Alexander Petrov and two other men were responsible for DDoS for hire and extortion.  A multinational law enforcement group of British, American, and Russian private individuals and law enforcement agents captured Alexander Petrov and his two accomplices, Ivan Maksakov and Denis Stepanov.

The three were heading an extortion ring which was extorting money from various online services, e.g. banks, Internet casinos, and other web based businesses.  Reportedly, the damages caused by the ring are in the millions of dollars range.  On October 8, 2007, Petrov, Maksakov, and Stenanov were found guilty and were sentenced to eight years in prison in the Russian Federation and fined 100,000 rubles.

See also
Denial of service attack
Barrett Lyon

External links
 Eight Years for Extorting Millions

References

Living people
Year of birth missing (living people)